Veronika Margaret Megler (born 14 October 1960) is an Australian computer scientist. Megler is currently principal data scientist at Amazon Web Services, and is well known as the co-developer of The Hobbit, a 1982 text adventure game adapted from the novel by J. R. R. Tolkien.

Education
Megler was born in 1960, and educated in Melbourne at Mac.Robertson Girls' High School, where she was school valedictorian in science. She began studying science at the University of Melbourne, intending to major in statistics but switching to a computer science major which she found more enjoyable.

Beam Software
At university, she saw a job notice for a position as a programmer at video game development studio Beam Software/Melbourne House, which she successfully applied for, becoming the company's first employee. She recruited her friend, Philip Mitchell, into Beam and the two began working on an illustrated interactive fiction game based on The Hobbit by J. R. R. Tolkien, with Megler concentrating on the game's physics system and a measure of autonomy for non-player characters.

Megler and Mitchell also developed another Beam game, Penetrator, also released in 1982.

Computer science career
Prior to her graduation from the University of Melbourne, Megler resigned from Beam to concentrate on her studies, and Mitchell remained to complete the ZX Spectrum version. Megler worked at IBM as an information technology architect, operating system expert and consultant. In 2009, she left IBM to study for a master's degree and PhD in computer science for scientific big data at Portland State University. She currently lives in Portland, Oregon and is principal data scientist at Amazon Robotics.

References

External links

1960 births
Living people
Australian computer scientists
Women data scientists
Australian video game designers
University of Melbourne alumni
University of Melbourne women
Portland State University alumni
Scientists from Melbourne
People educated at Mac.Robertson Girls' High School